Stanhopea anfracta is a species of orchid occurring from southeastern Ecuador to Bolivia.

References

External links 

anfracta
Orchids of Bolivia
Orchids of Ecuador